The following is a list of all suspensions and fines enforced in the National Hockey League (NHL) during the 2019–20 NHL season. It lists which players or coaches of what team have been punished for which offense and the amount of punishment they have received.

Based on each player's average annual salary, divided by number of days in the season (186) for non-repeat offenders and games (82) for repeat offenders, salary will be forfeited for the term of their suspension. Players' money forfeited due to suspension or fine goes to the Players' Emergency Assistance Fund, while money forfeited by coaches, staff or organizations as a whole go to the NHL Foundation.

Suspensions
† - suspension covered at least one 2019 NHL preseason game
‡ - suspension covered at least one 2020 postseason game
# - suspension was later reduced upon further review/successful appeal; information presented in italics
 - Player was considered a repeat offender under the terms of the Collective Bargaining Agreement (player had been suspended in the 18 months prior to this suspension)

Notes
1. All figures are in US dollars.
2. Fines generated for games lost due to suspension for off-ice conduct are calculated uniquely and irrespective of repeat offender status.
3. Voynov was previously suspended indefinitely on October 20, 2014, for his actions.
4. Voynov and the NHLPA appealed the suspension to a neutral arbitrator on April 20, 2019. On May 23, 2019, NHL/NHLPA Neutral Discipline Arbitrator, Shyam Das, upheld NHL Commissioner Gary Bettman's one-season (one-year) suspension, but the neutral arbitrator ruled that Voynov should be credited with having already served 41 games of his suspension during the 2018–19 NHL season. Accordingly, the suspension will remain in effect until 41 games of the 2019–20 NHL season have been served.
5. Voynov did not have an active contract at the time of this ruling, and therefore did not forfeit any salary due to games lost.
6. Suspension accompanied by mandatory referral to the NHL/NHLPA Program for Substance Abuse and Behavioral Health.
7. The precise parameters of Lemieux's suspension were originally delayed due to the suspension of the regular season due to COVID-19.

Fines
Players can be fined up to 50% of one day's salary, up to a maximum of $10,000.00 for their first offense, and $15,000.00 for any subsequent offenses (player had been fined in the 12 months prior to this fine). Coaches, non-playing personnel, and teams are not restricted to such maximums, though can still be treated as repeat offenders.

Fines for players/coaches fined for diving/embellishment are structured uniquely and are only handed out after non-publicized warnings are given to the player/coach for their first offense. For more details on diving/embellishment fines:

 For coach incident totals, each citation issued to a player on his club counts toward his total.
 All figures are in US dollars.

Fines listed in italics indicate that was the maximum allowed fine.

Notes
1. All figures are in US dollars.
2. Stalock was issued his first citation following an incident on October 12, 2019.
3. Tortorella was also assessed a conditional fine of $25,000 that would be assessed if he committed a second violation prior to December 29, 2020.
4. Arvidsson was issued his first citation following an incident on December 27, 2019.
5. Brind'Amour was also assessed a conditional fine of $25,000 that would be assessed if he committed a second violation prior to August 12, 2021.
6. This fine is the collection of a conditional fine assessed January 1, 2020.3
7. Arizona was forced to forfeit the club's 2nd-round pick in the 2020 NHL Draft and 1st-round pick in the 2021 NHL Draft in lieu of a cash fine.

Further reading

See also 
 2018–19 NHL suspensions and fines
 2020–21 NHL suspensions and fines
 2019 in sports
 2020 in sports
 2019–20 NHL season
 2019–20 NHL transactions

References

External links
NHL Collective Bargaining Agreement

Suspension and Fines
National Hockey League suspensions and fines